The Albatros L 56 was an experimental open transport biplane. It was cancelled when aircraft such as the Fokker F.II, Junkers F 13, and Sablatnig P.III were built.

Specifications 

 Engine: 1 Benz Bz.IV
 Length: 9.25 meters
 Span: 15.68 meters
 Weight: 1040 kilograms empty, 1800 kilograms when flying

References 

Biplanes